First Congregational Church and Lexington School (also known as New School Presbyterian Church and the Old Congregational Church) consists of an historic church building located at 47 Delaware Street and an historic school building located at 51 W. Church Street, both in Lexington, Ohio. The school building is now the Richland County Museum.

On February 23, 1979, the two buildings were added to the National Register of Historic Places.

References

External links

United Church of Christ churches in Ohio
Churches on the National Register of Historic Places in Ohio
Greek Revival architecture in Ohio
Gothic Revival church buildings in Ohio
Churches completed in 1846
School buildings completed in 1850
Churches in Richland County, Ohio
National Register of Historic Places in Richland County, Ohio